Peipiaosteus is an extinct genus of prehistoric chondrostean ray-finned fish. Its fossils are found in the Early Cretaceous Jiufotang Formation, Pani Lake, Liaoning Province, China.

Peipiaosteus belongs to the family Peipiaosteidae, together with the genera Liaosteus, Spherosteus, Stichopterus, and Yanosteus. Peipiaosteidae lived in Asia (China, Kazakhstan, Mongolia, Russia) during the Late Jurassic and Early Cretaceous epochs. They are closely related to Chondrosteidae (Early Jurassic, Europe) and to living sturgeon and paddlefish (Acipenseroidei).

See also

 Prehistoric fish
 List of prehistoric bony fish

References

Cretaceous bony fish
Prehistoric ray-finned fish genera
Acipenseriformes
Early Cretaceous fish of Asia